Amarpatti may refer to:

Amarpatti, Bara, Nepal
Amarpatti, Parsa, Nepal